GPI-anchor transamidase is an enzyme that in humans is encoded by the PIGK gene.

This gene encodes a member of the cysteine protease family C13 that is involved in glycosylphosphatidylinositol (GPI)-anchor biosynthesis. The GPI-anchor is a glycolipid found on many blood cells and serves to anchor proteins to the cell surface. This protein is a member of the multisubunit enzyme GPI transamidase and is thought to be its enzymatic component. GPI transamidase mediates GPI anchoring in the endoplasmic reticulum, by catalyzing the transfer of fully assembled GPI units to proteins.

Interactions
PIGK has been shown to interact with PIGT and GPAA1.

References

Further reading

External links